In the United Kingdom, the expression "grey pound" is used in the context of marketing and or retail sources and refers to the purchasing power of elderly people as consumers. It is frequently used as a label for movies aimed at an older audience. A similar term exists for LGBT consumers, known as pink money.

Saga, a company whose products and services target the over-50s, estimated the value of the grey pound at £320 billion a year as of 2020. The grey pound is especially important in countries where older people hold disproportionate levels of wealth; in the UK, over-50s hold over three quarters of the financial wealth.

References

Economy of the United Kingdom
Old age in the United Kingdom